Graham Horace Drane (12 August 1916 – 16 October 1996) was an Australian sailor who competed in the 1956 Summer Olympics and in the 1964 Summer Olympics.

References

1916 births
1996 deaths
Australian male sailors (sport)
Olympic sailors of Australia
Sailors at the 1956 Summer Olympics – Dragon
Sailors at the 1964 Summer Olympics – Dragon
20th-century Australian people